Kotel is a remote settlement in the hills west of Sodražica in southern Slovenia. It no longer has any permanent residents. The area is part of the traditional region of Lower Carniola and is now included in the Southeast Slovenia Statistical Region.

References

External links
Kotel on Geopedia

Populated places in the Municipality of Sodražica